Alfred Harvey Gibson (9 April 1886 – 7 September 1940) was an Australian rules footballer who played with Carlton in the Victorian Football League (VFL).

Notes

External links 

Harvey Gibson's profile at Blueseum		
 

1886 births
1940 deaths
Australian rules footballers from Victoria (Australia)
Carlton Football Club players
North Melbourne Football Club (VFA) players